Srbská Kamenice is a municipality and village in Děčín District in the Ústí nad Labem Region of the Czech Republic. It has about 300 inhabitants.

History
The first written mention of Srbská Kamenice is from 1352. It was founded in the early 11th century by Sorbs, refugees from Germany after a military campaign of Henry II.

Sights
The landmark of Srbská Kamenice is the Church of Saint Wenceslaus. It was built in 1772–1776.

There is an open-air museum of Czechoslovak border fortifications, built in 1937–1938. It consists of a number of reinforced concrete fortresses.

References

External links

Villages in Děčín District
Bohemian Switzerland
Populated places established in the 11th century